The Ministry of Roads and Urban Development (Vezārat-e Rāh-e va Shahrsāzi) is an Iranian government body in charge of providing and regulating the country's transport infrastructure (including roads, railroads, shipping lanes and airways), as well as setting policies for the housing sector and construction industry. This Ministry was formed on 27 June 2011, when the two ministries of Housing and Urban Development and Roads and Transportation were merged.

Companies and organizations, such as Iran Air, I.R. Iran Railways, and Iran's Ports and Maritime Organization (PMO) function under the supervision of the Ministry of Roads and Urban Development.

The Ministry follows a set of objectives and missions in the transport, urban development and housing sectors. These include, but are not limited to: formulating and implementing policies in these sectors, providing and maintaining infrastructure, creating national plans for urban development and fostering urban regeneration, coordinating efforts in the aforementioned sectors with the private sector, as well as administrative affairs on a national level.

Departments within the Ministry 

 Housing and Construction
 Human Resource Management and Development
 Legal, Parliamentary Affairs and Provinces
 Planning and Resource Management
 Transport
 Urban Planning and Architecture

Affiliated Companies and Organizations of the Ministry 

Ports and Maritime Organization (PMO)
Iran Railway Company 
Civil Aviation Organization
Islamic Republic of Iran's Airline  (Iran Air)
Iran's Airports and Air Navigation Company
Executive Organization for Public and Government Buildings and Infrastructure
 Iran's New Towns Development Corporate Holding Company
Roads, Housing and Urban Planning Research Center
Iran's Roads Maintenance and Transportation Organization
Iran’s Meteorological Organization
Technical and Soil Mechanics Laboratory Company
Construction and Development of Transport Infrastructures Company
Housing Foundation of Islamic Revolution
 National Land and Housing Organization
 Iran's Urban Regeneration Corporate Holding Company

Ministers of Roads and Urban Development
Mehrdad Bazrpash (7 December 2022 – Present) 
Shahriar Afandizadeh (22 November 2022 – 7 December 2022) (Acting)
Rostam Ghasemi (25 August 2021 – 22 November 2022) 
Mohammad Eslami (20 October 2018 – 25 August 2021) 
Abbas Ahmad Akhoundi (15 August 2013 – 20 October 2018)
Ali Nikzad (27 June 2011 – 15 August 2013)

Ministers of Roads and Transportation
Hamid Behbahani (Aug. 05, 2008 – Feb. 01, 2011)
Mohammad Rahmati  (Feb. 02, 2005 – July 12, 2008)
Ahmad Khorram  (Aug. 22, 2001 – Oct. 03, 2004)
Rahman Dadman  (Jan. 14, 2001 – May 17, 2001)
Mahmoud Hojjati  (Aug. 20, 1997 – Jan. 14, 2001)
Akbar Torkan  (Aug. 16, 1993 – Aug. 20, 1997)
Mohammad Saeedikia  (1985–1993)
Mohammad Hadi Nezhad Hosseinian  (1981–1985)
Mousa Kalantari  (1980–1981)
Yousef Taheri  (1979–1980)

Ministers of Housing and Urban Development
Ali Nikzad (2009–2011)
Mohammad Saeedikia (2005–2009)
Ali Abdolalizadeh (1997–2005)
Abbas Ahmad Akhoundi (1993–1997)
Serajedin Kazerooni (1984–1993)
Mir-Hossein Mousavi (acting) (1983–1984) 
Mohammad Shahab Gonabadi (1980–1983)
Mohsen Yahyavi (1979–1980)
Mostafa Katiraei (1979)

History

The ministry was founded in 1877 as the Ministry of Public Benefits at the time of Naseredin Shah. The ministry was responsible for roads and bridge construction as well as their maintenance. After the formation of General Bureau of Roads in 1922, it was renamed as Ministry of Ways by a Parliamentary law in 1929. Later in 1936 Parliament passed a law to call it the Ministry of Roads, and again on July 6, 1974, it was renamed as Ministry of Roads and Transportation.

Ministry of Roads and Transportation

Ministry of Roads and Transportation of Iran, was the main organ of Iranian Government responsible for administration of roadway, railway, airway and seaway transport inside the country and transport connections between Iran and other countries. The last acting minister was Ali Nikzad. The ministry consisted of five deputies as:
Deputy for Development of Management Resources
Deputy for Parliamentary Affairs & Provinces Coordination
Deputy for Education, Research & Technology
Deputy for Planning & Transport Economy
Deputy for Construction & Maintenance of Rural Roads

In June 2011, Ministry of Housing and Urban Development and the Ministry of Roads and Transportation were merged into what was then called the Ministry of Transportation and Housing.

See also
Construction industry of Iran
Transport in Iran
International Rankings of Iran in Transport
Airlines of Iran
Cabinet of Iran
Government of Iran

References

External links

Homepage of the Ministry of Roads and Urban Development
Webpage of the Ministry of Housing and Urban Development
Former Ministry of Roads and Transportation 
Former Ministry of Roads and Transportation (Archive)
Former ministry News (Archive)

2011 establishments in Iran
Transportation and Housing
Iran
Iran, Transportation and Housing
Iran
Transport organisations based in Iran